The Mithi River (Pronunciation: [miʈʰiː]) is a river on Salsette Island, the island of the city of Mumbai, India. It is a confluence of tail-water discharges of the Powai and Vihar lakes. The river is seasonal and rises during the monsoons. The overflowing lakes also contribute to the river flow, which is stopped by a dam at other times. During this season, the gutter is a favourite with anglers, who can catch large fish that have escaped from the lakes. Chattrapati Shivaji Maharaj International Airport is located right next to the section of river at Andheri (E).

Geography

The river originates from the overflow of Vihar Lake and also receives the overflows from the Powai Lake about 2 km later. It flows for a total of 18 km before it meets the Arabian Sea at Mahim Creek flowing through residential and industrial complexes of Powai, Saki Naka, Kurla, Kalina, Vakola, Bandra-Kurla complex, Dharavi and Mahim.
The river has an average width of 5 metres in the upper reaches, has been widened to 25 m in the middle reaches and up to 70 m in the lower reaches after 26 July 2005 deluge (944 mm in 24 h on 26 July 2005).

Ecology
It is also less well known that the Mahim bay area, where Mithi River meets Arabian Sea is a nominated bird sanctuary where migratory birds come for nesting. This part is full of mangroves.
When the river was not as polluted as it is today, it used to serve as an important storm water drain for Mumbai but as it has been used as a sewer over the years, its importance as a storm water drain has reduced and on the contrary, it poses as a hazard during high tide bringing polluted water into the city and flooding the city.

Environmental degradation
The river has been polluted by dumping of raw sewage, industrial waste and municipal waste into the river. Besides this, illegal activities like washing vessels, animals and oily drums, discharge of unauthorised hazardous waste are also carried out along the course of this river. Cattle sheds in some areas contribute animal waste. Barrel cleaners, scrap dealers and others dump sludge oil, effluent and garbage in the river. The organic waste, sludge and garbage dumping has reduced the carrying capacity of the river. The water with mixture of sewage and industrial waste is a threat to marine life. The river bed is full of sludge, garbage and vegetation growth like water hyacinth in many parts.

The city of Mumbai earned the epithet – 'Cottonopolis of India' due to its vibrant cotton textile mills. The mills over the years have utilized water from this river and dumped their waste into it leading to the present polluted state of the river.

Cleanup
The Municipal Corporation of Greater Mumbai has undertaken a cleanliness drive lately so that the floods of 26 July 2005 are not repeated. An environmental group has been formed by Rajendra Singh, an award-winning conservationist in 2009. The BMC has been able to remove just 267,000 cubic metres so far, or 60% of what is required. It aims to revive the dying river and the entire operation at Mithi will be done through solar power in an attempt to stay energy neutral. Recently environmentalist Afroz Shah has launched campaigns with the local citizens of Mumbai to clean the Mithi river, to much success.

Development 
Many young entrepreneurs in and around Mumbai are now aggressively involved with raising awareness of the degradation of the Mithi River, and creating awareness on a global scale as the government of India has again began to ignore this extremely important issue.
In 2009, environmentalist and Magsaysay Award winner, Rajendra Singh lead a yatra, of a group of environmentalist and NGOs, through Mumbai city along the degraded Mithi river to highlight its problems.

A Contemporary Art show was also held in 2009 to increase awareness of the dire situation of the Mithi River in Bombay by Chintan Upadhyay titled Khatti – Mithi

See also

List of rivers of India
Rivers of India
Seven Islands of Bombay

References

External links 

 Five Disasters Waiting to Happen, a film that chronicles the Mithi river's ecological issues.
 Mithi river water pollution and recommendations for its control by Maharashtra Pollution Control Board
 'Making the Sewer...a River Again – Why Mumbai must reclaim its Mithi.' A film by Riddhi J Chokhawala, Gautam Kirtane and Dhaval Desai, Research Fellows, Observer Research Foundation Mumbai
 Kadinsky, Sergey "Mithi River, Mumbai" Hidden Waters Blog 1 February 2016

Rivers of Mumbai